Randy Ellis from Queen's University in Kingston, Ontario, was named Fellow of the Institute of Electrical and Electronics Engineers (IEEE) in 2015 for contributions to image guided surgical technology.

References 

Fellow Members of the IEEE
Living people
Year of birth missing (living people)